Eugenia tabouensis is a small tree in the family Myrtaceae. It is endemic to the tropical rainforests of Ivory Coast.  It is threatened by habitat loss.

References

tabouensis
Endemic flora of Ivory Coast
Trees of Africa
Vulnerable flora of Africa
Taxonomy articles created by Polbot